Scott Mactavish is an American filmmaker and author.

Scott Mactavish recently wrote, produced and directed the films entitled MURPH: The Protector and God and Country: Untold Stories of the American Military.   Prior to that, he made Summer Running: The Race to Cure Breast Cancer featuring Sissy Spacek. He has also served as executive producer on five films in as many years, including Chagas, directed by Ricardo Preve. Mactavish attended film School at New York University, and upon graduation, worked on major studio projects and independent features while writing original screenplays at night.  He was a Goomba in the 1993 film Super Mario Bros. and an uncredited stunt double in The Crow. He launched his own production company in 1998 and has produced dozens of films and videos, with an emphasis on stories of honor, courage and commitment.

Scott is the author of The New Dad's Survival Guide, published by Little, Brown and Co., and co-author of Battle Ready: Memoir of a SEAL Warrior Medic, published by St. Martin's Press.

As a freelance writer, he has contributed to Indiewire, Windcheck, and Film Threat.

Mactavish is a veteran of the United States Navy.  He attended boot camp at the Recruit Training Command in San Diego, California and served with Submarine Squadron 6, aboard the USS L.Y. Spear, and in Guantanamo Bay, Cuba.

Movies 
Family Mission: The TJ Lobraico Story - Writer, Producer, Director
MURPH: The Protector - Writer, Producer, Director
Ride for Lance - Writer, Producer, Director
God and Country: Untold Stories of the American Military - Writer, Producer, Director
Summer Running: The Race to Cure Breast Cancer - Writer, Producer, Director
Chagas:  A Hidden Affliction - Executive Producer
Stickball Boulevard - Executive Producer
Under the Trestle - Producer, Director

Books
The New Dad's Survival Guide
Battle Ready: Memoir of a SEAL Warrior Medic

References

External links
Official website

MURPH: The Protector
The New Dad's Survival Guide
Ride for Lance
MURPH: The Protector
Battle Ready: Memoir of a SEAL Warrior Medic

Living people
American male writers
American filmmakers
Year of birth missing (living people)